Cameron Downtown Historic District is a national historic district located at Cameron, Marshall County, West Virginia. It encompasses 27 contributing buildings in the commercial core developed after a severe fire in 1895 which destroyed much of the downtown area. They are large 2-4 story brick buildings reflecting the Classical Revival and Colonial Revival styles. Notable buildings include the Masonic Lodge 17 (c. 1900), Romine Building/Moose Lodge 758 (c. 1900), First Presbyterian Church (1907), First United Methodist Church (1894), Hotel Main (c. 1896-1897), Finlayson's 5 & 10/ Senior Citizens Building (c. 1896), Flatiron Building (1896), First Christian Church of Cameron (1896), and Old B&O Freight Station (1878).

It was listed on the National Register of Historic Places in 1998.

References

External links

Historic districts in Marshall County, West Virginia
Colonial Revival architecture in West Virginia
Neoclassical architecture in West Virginia
Buildings and structures in Marshall County, West Virginia
National Register of Historic Places in Marshall County, West Virginia
Historic American Buildings Survey in West Virginia
Historic districts on the National Register of Historic Places in West Virginia